Hans Majestet Kongens Garde (HMKG) (lit., His Majesty The King's Guard; the Royal Guards) is a battalion of the Norwegian Army. The battalion has two main roles; it serves as the Norwegian King's bodyguards, guarding the royal residences (the Royal Palace in Oslo, Bygdøy Kongsgård and Skaugum) and Akershus Fortress in Oslo, and is also the main infantry unit responsible for the defence of Oslo. The HMKG is located in Huseby leir in Oslo. Huseby leir is located on the old Oslo farm Nordre Huseby gård (Northern Huseby farm), which was acquired by the Norwegian government in the late 19th century.

History

The first all-Norwegian unit of the royal guard of Sweden and Norway were a 38-man strong squadron of despatch riders from the Akerhusiske ridende Jægercorpses gevorbne Escadron, and its main function was to go as messengers between Stockholm and Christiania. By 1856 this service was obsolete, and the king decided to form a new Norwegian infantry company to be part of the guard. 
The Norwegian guards company was formally formed from members of the Norwegian Corps of Jäger, mainly from Stjørdal, on 8 November 1856 by King Oscar I, in order to underline his status as king of both Norway and Sweden.  The company moved from Stockholm to Kristiania in 1888, where, in addition to its guards duties, it served as a trials unit. On Norway's independence in 1905, the company became the new guards unit for King Haakon VII and was increased to battalion size. The battalion served with distinction during the Second World War, where it prevented the Wehrmacht from capturing the Royal Family and the Cabinet at the Midtskogen Gård on 10 April. This gave the Guards its first battle honour. Later in the campaign, the Guards fought with distinction on Dovrefjell and at Lundehøgda, near Lillehammer, winning their third battle honour. During the campaign in central Norway they were known among the German soldiers who fought them as "die schwarzen Teufel" or "the black devils", due to their ferocity and dark uniforms.

In August 2022, 30 Royal Guards were kicked out of the armed forces after a process that was said to involve drug testing; however, the chief of the Royal Guard said later in August that the hair samples were not analyzed, due to a "technical failure". Authorities had earlier in August claimed that the test kits that (allegedly) were used were not considered reliable, therefore the positive tests - the evidence - were not kept in evidence. "The ex-soldiers" are claiming that coersion was used; they were (allegedly) told that "the case" would be on their civilian police-record; however, the Norwegian Armed Forces went over to a new practice two years ago: drug cases do not get turned over to civilian police authorities. The drug tests in 2022 - by taking hair samples - were done by corporals taking hair samples; none of the personnel that work in the "narcotics group" of the military police, were present; the soldiers were given an impression that they would get reduced punishment if they admitted to illegal use of drugs; One soldier called the process a bluff so that one could elicit confessions. The chief of the armed forces' "narcotics group", says that drug tests can be done, however if they are done against specific suspects, then (each) drug test has to be part of (any number of individual) criminal cases. As of 26 August, the Chief of Defence is satisfied with the report that he has been given.

Military organization

The HMKG is organized as a light infantry battalion of five companies:

Each of the rifle companies takes turns in carrying out guard duty at the royal residences in between other duties. The majority of Guardsmen are National Servicemen who are posted to the regiment after their basic training. On arriving at the battalion from basic training, they spend their first five weeks in ceaseless drill practice, hand-to-hand fighting, physical training, close range firing and case solving exercises before they are allowed to perform their first duties outside the royal palace or around the Royal Family's country residence. In addition the guards practice specialized operations within their platoons, and whenever a company becomes the oldest unit within the battalion (longest period of conscription), the company enters service as gardestridsgruppe (guard battle group), GSG, with a 72-hour emergency response time. The mission of the GSG is classified, but it was used during the 22 July attacks on Oslo in 2011.

The changing of the guard ceremony in front of The Palace takes place at 1330–1400 hours every day and is a popular event with tourists and the people of Oslo alike. In addition to performing guard duty, the Guards is also on parade whenever important state events take place in the capital. These include the annual opening of parliament by the King, visits by foreign heads of state, or anniversaries of major events in the history of the nation.

Traditions

Uniform
The dark blue dress uniforms have remained virtually unchanged throughout the regiment's existence. One noteworthy detail of the uniform is the plumed bowler hat, which was copied from the hat of the Italian Bersaglieri troops—a regiment that so impressed the Swedish princess Louise (the great grandmother of King Harald V) that she insisted the Norwegian guards be similarly hatted in 1860. The regiment's cap badge is a rosette in the royal colours of Norway, with the monogram of the current monarch.

Mascot in Scotland

The regiment's official mascot is a king penguin named Nils Olav, a resident of Edinburgh Zoo. The first penguin was adopted during the regiment's first participation in the Edinburgh Military Tattoo in 1961 and was given the rank of visekorporal (lance corporal). Nils Olav was promoted each time the King's Guard has returned to the Tattoo. In 1982 he was made corporal and was promoted to sergeant in 1987. Nils Olav died shortly after his promotion to sergeant, and his place of honour was taken by Nils Olav II, his two-year-old near-double. He was promoted in 1993 to the rank of regimental sergeant major. On 18 August 2005 he was promoted to Colonel-in-Chief. Nils Olav was the first penguin to hold this rank in the Norwegian army. He was also awarded the Norwegian Army's Long Service and Good Conduct medal on that date.
 
The current mascot is Nils Olav III, who on 15 August 2008 was knighted, then on 22 August 2016 he was promoted to the rank of Brigadier at a ceremony outside the zoo's penguin enclosure by British Major General Euan Loudon acting on behalf of Norway's King Harald V. Reuters reported that a detachment of the King's Guard in full dress uniform was reviewed by the penguin, who wore his new insignia on a badge strapped to one flipper.

Standards

Gallery

Alliances
 - The Yorkshire Regiment (14th/15th, 19th and 33rd/76th Foot) (Bond of Friendship)

References

External links

 HMKG's website
 Norske Gardeveteraners Drillkontingent Official Website
 Orkiestra Norweskiej Gwardii Królewskiej - Wasielgallery · YouTube
 HMKG at the main street of Oslo may 17. (NRK)

 
Military units and formations established in 1856
Battalions of Norway
Royal guards
Guards regiments
1856 establishments in Norway
Norwegian monarchy